Igreja de Santo António  is a church in Portugal. It is classified as a National Monument.

Churches in Faro District
National monuments in Faro District
Lagos, Portugal